Mark Bullock (24 October 1872 – 22 April 1925) was an English cricketer: a batsman who played four first-class matches for Worcestershire in 1900. His top score of 21 came on debut against Leicestershire and proved important, as Worcestershire won a low-scoring game by just ten runs.

He was born in Dudley, then in Worcestershire, and died in Leicester at the age of 52.

External links
 

1872 births
1925 deaths
English cricketers
Worcestershire cricketers
Sportspeople from Dudley